The men's 20 kilometres walk event at the 1987 Summer Universiade was held in Zagreb on 13 July 1987.

Results

References

Athletics at the 1987 Summer Universiade
1987